Isopromethazine is an antihistamine and anticholinergic of the phenothiazine chemical class. It is structurally analogous to promethazine.

See also 
 Promethazine

References 

Phenothiazines
H1 receptor antagonists